The Provincial Rights Party was a political party in Manitoba, Canada founded by Thomas Greenway in 1882. It opposed the John Norquay government for being too close to the Conservative Party of Canada led by John A. Macdonald, the Prime Minister of Canada. The party called for greater provincial control over resources and the railway, and soon merged with the fledgling Manitoba Liberal Party.

Political history of Manitoba
Provincial political parties in Manitoba